Donald Loftus Page (born 25 May 1951) an Australian politician, was a member of the New South Wales Legislative Assembly representing Ballina for the National Party from 1988 to 2015. Page was deputy leader of the National Party in New South Wales from 2003 to 2007.

Early years and background
Page is the grandson of former Australian Prime Minister Sir Earle Page.  He was educated at the University of New England where he completed the degrees of Bachelor of Economics, Diploma in Rural Accounting, and Master of Economics.  He played rugby union for New South Wales at under-23 level. Prior to becoming the member for Ballina, he was a financial analyst, economist, administrative manager, part-time lecturer, and beef producer. He has four children.

Political career
His parliamentary career has included a stint as deputy leader of the NSW Nationals from 2003 to 2007. Page was appointed as Minister for Local Government and as Minister for the North Coast in the O'Farrell government and served in these roles between 2011 and 2014. On 22 April 2014, Page announced his intention to retire from politics at the next state election.

References

 

Members of the New South Wales Legislative Assembly
National Party of Australia members of the Parliament of New South Wales
Living people
Australian people of English descent
1951 births
Place of birth missing (living people)
21st-century Australian politicians